A constitutional referendum was held in Yemen on 15 and 16 May 1991. The new constitution was reportedly approved by 98.5% of voters, with a 72.2% turnout.

Results

References

1991 referendums
1991 in Yemen
1991
Constitutional referendums